Alga is a village in Batken Region of Kyrgyzstan. It is part of the Leylek District. Its population was 1,439 in 2021.

References 

Populated places in Batken Region